Saint Reticius (or Rheticus, Rheticius) (early 4th century) was a bishop of Autun, the first one known to history, according to the Catholic Encyclopedia.  He was a Gallo-Roman, and an ecclesiastical writer, and served as bishop of this see from around 310 to 334 AD.

He traveled on behalf of Emperor Constantine the Great in 313 to the Synod of Rome and in 314 to the Synod of Arles, in order to bring about a resolution to the dispute with the Donatists.

Gregory of Tours praised Reticius in his writings.  Saint Jerome mentions Reticius in his De Viris Illustribus:

Reticius, bishop of Autun, among the Aedui, had a great reputation in Gaul in the reign of
Constantine. I have read his commentaries On the Song of Songs and another great volume
Against Novatian but besides these, I have found no works of his.

Reticius was succeeded by Cassian of Autun, also venerated as a saint.

References

External links

Reticius von Autun 

4th-century bishops in Gaul
Bishops of Autun
330s deaths
Gallo-Roman saints
Aedui
Year of birth unknown